R. Christopher "Chris" Barden (born 1954) Ph.D., J.D., L.P. is a scientist, clinical psychologist and attorney who lives in Plymouth, Minnesota. He served as the director of the National Association for Consumer Protection In Mental Health Practices (NACPMHP) from 1995 to 2005. In 2005, the NACPMHP merged into the Commission for Scientific Medicine and Mental Health (CSMMH), a national health care consumer protection agency whose members include physicians, scientists and researchers.

Biography

Education
Barden was educated at the Institute for Child Development at the University of Minnesota, receiving his B.A. summa cum laude, Distinguished Graduating Senior Award, in 1976. He attended graduate school at the University of California in Berkeley, the University of Minnesota, and the Palo Alto V.A./Stanford University Medical Center, where he interned, receiving his Ph.D. in Child and Adult Clinical Psychology in 1982. He later attended Harvard Law School in Cambridge, Massachusetts, receiving his J.D. cum laude in 1992. He became a licensed psychologist in Texas in 1984 and in Minnesota in 1988. He has been a licensed Minnesota attorney since 1992, and a certified Minnesota mediator since 1994.

Career

R. Chris Barden, Ph.D., J.D., L.P. has worked as a scientist, psychologist, attorney, and expert witness. Barden has published in or edited journals and texts in child psychology, social psychology, clinical psychology, sports psychology, psychiatry, surgery, pediatrics, and law.  He has testified as an expert witness in psychology, law, and scientific methodology in multiple federal and state courts. Barden has also helped draft and enact successful national health care legislation mandating reforms in the U.S. Emergency Medical System for Children.   Barden has applied a multidisciplinary, litigation-policy team approach to institute reforms in the U.S. emergency medical, legal, and mental health systems.  In 2006, Barden drafted an amicus curiae brief to the California Supreme Court signed by nearly 100 international experts in the fields of human memory, neuroscience, psychiatry, and psychology emphasizing the lack of credible scientific support for "repressed and recovered memories.

Psychiatric Malpractice Cases Regarding "Repressed Memory Therapy" and "Multiple Personality Disorder"

Barden has participated as an attorney, consultant, and expert witness in multiple malpractice lawsuits against therapists, and has spoken out against therapies such as “repressed and recovered memory therapies,” “rebirthing therapies” and “holding therapies.”

Consultant: Federal Bureau of Investigation, U.S. Attorneys Office, and Office of the Federal Public Defender
State Prosecution Expert Witness, Colorado
State Prosecution Expert Consultant, Washington
State Prosecution Expert Witness, Texas
State Prosecution Expert Consultant, Wisconsin
State Office of the Public Defender (MN, WI, UT)
Invited Training Speaker, American Bar Association 
Invited Training Speaker, American Psychological Association 
Invited Training Speaker, U.S. Surgeon Generalâ€™s Conference
Invited Training Speaker, U.S. Military Academy, West Point, New York 
Invited Speaker at Harvard, Yale, Columbia, UC Berkeley, U of MN, U of TX, U of IA, U of GA, USC, SMU, Penn State, U of NC, etc. 
Special Asst. Attorney General, State of Utah
Member, Minnesota State Board of Psychology 
Member, Minnesota Higher Education Coordinating Board
Intern, Harvard Medical School/Law School Forensic Program 
Intern, Attorney Generalâ€™s Office, State of Massachusetts
Consultant to a number of states regarding Mental Health Professional Licensing Bd. Actions

Hamanne v. Humenansky (1994)

Barden represented V. Hamanne in her suit against her former psychiatrist, Diane Humenansky, for implanting false memories of child abuse using “repressed memory therapy.”  Expert witnesses Dr. Elizabeth Loftus and Dr. Richard Ofshe testified that repressed memory therapy was unsupported by scientific evidence and dangerous.  The jury awarded Hamanne $2.6 Million for pain and suffering, lost earnings, and medical expenses.  Dr. Humenansky license was later suspended.

Carlson v. Humenansky (1996)

Barden also represented E. Carlson in her suit against Dr. Humenansky for using “repressed memory therapy.

Burgus v. Braun (1997)

Barden represented P. Burgess in her malpractice suit against Dr. Bennett Braun.  Burgess claimed that Braun’s use of repressed memory therapy and his diagnosis of “multiple personality disorder” caused them severe emotional, psychological, and financial harm.  The case was settled in 1997 for a record $10.6 Million. A wave of international media attention from this case—including a page 1, col. 1 story in the NYTimes—was instrumental in subsequent mental health reforms.

Reform litigation regarding "Rebirthing Therapy" and Coercive "Holding Therapy" 

"REBIRTHING THERAPY": Barden joined forces with the national media as well as prosecutors and legislators in Colorado to end “rebirthing therapy” in the U.S.  "It's easily the most reckless and abusive treatment of a child I've ever seen," said Christopher Barden, a psychologist and lawyer who specializes in psychotherapy abuse cases. Barden testified for Jefferson County prosecutors in their criminal case against Evergreen therapists Connell Watkins and Julie Ponder. The pair are charged in connection with the April 18 rebirthing session that killed Candace Newmaker, a 10-year-old adopted girl from North Carolina.” ;  See, Janofsky, M. Girl's Death Brings Ban on Kind of 'Therapy'. New York Times.  April 18, 2001;  Peggy Lowe, Rebirthing team convicted: Two therapists face mandatory terms of 16 to 48 years in jail,  Rocky Mountain News,  April 21, 2001.

COERCIVE "HOLDING THERAPY": Barden was appointed Special Assistant Attorney General in Utah to assist in the prosecution of “coercive attachment” therapists.  Joint litigation and legislative efforts closed the clinic and ended these practices. See, Santini, J.,  Legislative Panel Backs Measure That Would Ban 'Holding Therapy', The Salt Lake Tribune,  September 20, 2002, Friday, at Pg. A10.  "Before voting to support the measure, the Child Welfare Oversight Panel on Thursday considered testimony from Christopher Barden, an expert in child psychology, who called coercive therapy "quackery." "These therapists really believe they are helping people," Barden said, "just like lobotomizers believed they were helping people." The bill Barden co-authored and supported (HB05) to ban abusive practices passed the Utah House of Representatives by a 68-2 margin.

Political campaign
On April 28, 2010, Barden announced that he would seek the Republican Party of Minnesota's endorsement for Attorney General of Minnesota. He received that endorsement at the party's state convention on April 29, 2010, and lost his challenge to incumbent Attorney General Lori Swanson in the November 2010 general election.

Personal life

Barden is a member of the Church of Jesus Christ of Latter-day Saints and served as a bishop in the Lake Nokomis Ward in Minneapolis, Minnesota. Barden has four children with his wife Robin Jones. They currently reside in suburban Minneapolis.

References

External links
"Barden Launches Campaign for Attorney General" MN Democrats Exposed 4/28/2010
"Chris Barden challenges Lori Swanson for Attorney General post" City Pages 4/28/2010
Resume: R. Christopher Barden

Living people
1954 births
Minnesota lawyers
21st-century American psychologists
University of Minnesota College of Education and Human Development alumni
UC Berkeley College of Letters and Science alumni
Harvard Law School alumni
People from Edina, Minnesota
Minnesota Republicans
Latter Day Saints from Minnesota
Candidates in the 2010 United States elections
20th-century American psychologists